Manuel Cousin is a French professional sailor born on 10 July 1967 in Rouen who is competing in the 2020–2021 Vendée Globe sailing IMOCA 60 named Groupe Sétinhe completed the race in 103 days 18hours 15minutes. He started his professional sailing career late having been worked for Toyota forklifts as an account manager of which Groupe Sétin were one of the suppliers. He has a Diploma in Robotics Industrial Maintenance.

References

External links
 Vendee Campaign Website

1967 births
Living people
Sportspeople from Rouen
French male sailors (sport)
Class 40 class sailors
IMOCA 60 class sailors
French Vendee Globe sailors
2020 Vendee Globe sailors
Vendée Globe finishers
Single-handed circumnavigating sailors